The Fever Nurses Association was established in London in 1908.

The governing body had 39 members: 20 doctors and 19 matrons and assistant matrons, mostly from fever hospitals and some from the hospitals run by the Metropolitan Asylums Board. Nurse Susan Villiers was a member.

It was associated with the campaign for nurse registration led by Ethel Bedford-Fenwick, and was represented on the Central Committee for the State Registration of Nurses which was established in 1908.

A scheme for training fever nurses was established after it was set up.

References

Nursing organisations in the United Kingdom